John Ryder was an Irish Anglican priest in the 18th-century.

The son of John Ryder, Archbishop of Tuam, he was educated at Trinity College, Dublin.  He was Dean of Lismore from 1762  until his death on 18 April 1791.

References

Alumni of Trinity College Dublin
Deans of Lismore
1791 deaths
Year of birth unknown